The 2013 New York Yankees season was the 111th season for the New York Yankees franchise.  The Yankees began their season at home with an 8–2 loss against the Boston Red Sox on April 1. They finished tied for third place in the American League East with an 85–77 record, which was their worst since 1992. The Yankees failed to reach the playoffs for the first time since 2008 and only the second time in nineteen years.

Longtime Yankees closer Mariano Rivera and longtime starting pitcher Andy Pettitte each retired following the 2013 season.

Pre-season acquisitions 
 On November 20, the Yankees re-signed Hiroki Kuroda to a one-year contract worth $15 million. 
 On November 28, the Yankees re-signed Andy Pettitte to a one-year contract worth $12 million. 
 On November 30, the Yankees re-signed Mariano Rivera to a one-year contract worth $10 million.
 On December 14, the Yankees signed Kevin Youkilis to a one-year contract worth $12 million. 
 On December 19, the Yankees re-signed Ichiro Suzuki to a two-year contract worth $13 million. 
 On February 1, the Yankees signed Travis Hafner to a one-year contract worth $2 million.
 On March 15, the Yankees signed Brennan Boesch to a one-year contract worth $1.5 million. 
 On March 26, the Yankees acquired Vernon Wells in a trade for two minor league players.

Regular season

April
Following a sour four-game sweep in the 2012 American League Championship Series and the loss of Derek Jeter to a broken ankle, expectations entering the Yankees' 113th season were uncharacteristically low. With the Blue Jays and Red Sox each making key acquisitions in the offseason as Yankee GM Brian Cashman's adjusted his strategy toward salary reduction, the American League East Division's reputation as a perennial powerhouse had shifted sharply against the Yankees. On Opening Day, the Bombers hosted their long–time rivals, the Boston Red Sox, but lost 8–2. Their next game was also a defeat, but veteran pitcher Andy Pettitte was able to prevent an early sweep by pitching to a 4–2 victory. Mariano Rivera would also earn his first save in what would be a farewell tour of sorts for the future Hall of Fame closer.

Much to the surprise of fans and pundits alike, the injury-plagued Yankees held a first place lead in the division at the end of April with a record of 16–10. On April 12, they turned a 4–6–5–6–5–3–4 triple play in the 8th inning of a 5-2 win against the Baltimore Orioles.

May
On May 9, Yankees second baseman Robinson Canó recorded his 1500th career hit with a single to center field at Coors Field in a 3-1 win against the Colorado Rockies. Without the help of core players Derek Jeter, Alex Rodriguez, Curtis Granderson, and Mark Teixeira, all of whom had been assigned to extended DL stints, the Yankees remained competitive through shrewd acquisitions of journeyman and platoon roleplayers such as Travis Hafner, Brennan Boesch, Lyle Overbay, and former Boston Red Sox first-baseman Kevin Youkilis. Though Granderson and Teixeira would return to the Yankee lineup by early summer, both would return to the DL after each suffered further injury. On May 30, the Yankees were swept by their crosstown rival New York Mets for the first time in the season series between the teams after a 3–1 loss at home.  The Mets' sweep come a full decade after the 2003 Yankees won all six games from the Mets. In the second game, Mariano Rivera suffered his first blown save of the season and the first in his career where he failed to get an out by allowing two runs in the ninth in a 2-1 loss.

June
Despite entering the month of June with winning records for both April and May, the Yankees would finish the month with unimpressive offensive productivity and, due in large part to continued injury, a frustratingly inconsistent lineup.  Following a sweep of the Cleveland Indians, the Yankees took three out of four games in Seattle and seemed capable of maintaining competitiveness until some of their core players returned. On June 8, Andy Pettitte won his 250th career win and Mariano Rivera continued his age-defying season by earning his 22nd save. But by the end of an extended west coast trip, Kevin Youkilis and Mark Teixeira's injuries were aggravated and both were lost for the remainder of the season. The Yankees lost three games against the Oakland Athletics, including the 18-inning finale to complete the sweep. The end of June looked bleak for the Yankees, winning only one of three games against the Texas Rangers and getting swept by the Baltimore Orioles for the first time since 2005. The Yankees finished June with a record of 11 wins and 16 losses, the first time they finished a month with a losing record since September 2010, where they went 12–15.

July

July showed some improvement after winning six straight games, their longest winning streak of the year. On July 1, pitcher Andy Pettitte recorded his 1,958th strikeout as a Yankee, becoming the franchise's all-time strikeout leader with a strikeout of the Minnesota Twins' Justin Morneau, surpassing Whitey Ford. They swept a four-game set against the Twins in Minnesota and won the first two of three at home versus the Orioles, but Rivera's second blown save of the season, similar to the first (allowing two runs in the ninth in a 2-1 loss) snapped the streak. The Yankees finished the first half by losing two of three to the Twins at home for the first time since 2001.

As was originally hoped at the beginning of the year, the return of much-needed reinforcements had started to look promising. Derek Jeter came back to the lineup for the first time since breaking his ankle in the 2012 ALCS, picking up a hit in his first at bat. Long-injured starting pitcher Michael Pineda also began playing in game situations in the minors, and third-baseman Alex Rodriguez had started at 20-game rehab assignment in Scranton. But Jeter's return was quickly marred by a quadriceps strain that would sideline the captain for several weeks after only one game.

With the summer trade deadline quickly approaching, the lack of right handed power, and the return dates of Rodriguez, Jeter, and Granderson still uncertain, the Yankees acquired outfielder Alfonso Soriano from the Chicago Cubs in the hopes of increasing the team's dismal power numbers (Soriano had hit 8 home runs the month prior to moving to New York, which is one more home run than the entire Yankee team had hit during that span). Soriano, who started his career with the Yankees, received a warm ovation from the Yankee fans upon his return on July 26. The New York Post reported soon after that Brian Cashman had reservations about acquiring Soriano, but was overruled by Yankee management.

Derek Jeter returned to the Yankee lineup for the second time on July 28 and hit a solo home run on the first pitch of his first at bat. Alfonso Soriano would hit a walk-off single to give the Yankees a 6–5 victory.

August
On August 5, Alex Rodriguez was suspended for 211 games (until the end of the 2014 MLB season) for his involvement with the South Florida anti-aging clinic Biogenesis. He promptly appealed this suspension and was allowed to resume play for the rest of the season, but the suspension was upheld for the entire 2014 MLB regular season and postseason.

On August 22, the Yankees swept a four-game set versus the Toronto Blue Jays at home for a perfect 10-0 home record versus them.

September
After sweeping a three-game set at home versus the Chicago White Sox to start the month after being swept by them in Chicago on August 5–7 for the second straight year, the Yankees lost the first three of four at home to the Red Sox with Rivera blowing two saves, but won the last on a ninth inning wild pitch. They took three of four from the Orioles in Camden Yards before being swept by the Red Sox at Fenway Park.

The Yankees closed interleague play with three games at home versus the San Francisco Giants. On September 20, Alex Rodriguez hit his 24th career grand slam to surpass Lou Gehrig as the all-time grand slam leader in a 5-1 win. Iván Nova pitched a complete shutout in the Yankees 6-0 win. In the series finale, Pettitte made his final home start in a 2-1 loss.

On September 25, 2013, the Yankees lost to the Tampa Bay Rays, which for the second time in the wild card era, eliminated them from making the playoffs for the first time since 2008. The Rays swept the three-game set in the Bronx for the first time ever and Rivera made his final appearance in the 8th inning of the series finale, retiring all four batters he faced.

The Yankees finished the season by sweeping the Houston Astros at Minute Maid Park with Pettitte earning his final victory in the second game.

Roster

Player stats

Batting 
Note: POS = Position; G = Games played; AB = At bats; R = Runs; H = Hits; 2B = Doubles; 3B = Triples; HR = Home runs; RBI = Runs batted in; SB = Stolen bases; BB = Walks; AVG = Batting average

Source:

Pitching 
Note: POS = Position; W = Wins; L = Losses; ERA = Earned run average; G = Games pitched; GS = Games started; SV = Saves; IP = Innings pitched; H = Hits allowed; R = Runs allowed; ER = Earned runs allowed; BB = Walks allowed; SO = Strikeouts

Source:

Season standings

American League East

American League Wild Card

Game log

|- align="center" bgcolor="#ffbbbb"
| 1 || April 1 || Red Sox || 2–8 || Lester (1–0) || Sabathia (0–1) || || 49,514 || 0–1 || L1
|- align="center" bgcolor="#ffbbbb"
| 2 || April 3 || Red Sox || 4–7 || Buchholz (1–0) || Kuroda (0–1) || Hanrahan (1) || 40,216 || 0–2 || L2
|- align="center" bgcolor="bbffbb"
| 3 || April 4 || Red Sox || 4–2 || Pettitte (1–0) || Dempster (0–1) || Rivera (1) || 40,611 || 1–2 || W1
|- align="center" bgcolor="ffbbbb"
| 4 || April 5 || @ Tigers || 3–8 || Fister (1–0) || Nova (0–1) || Smyly (1) || 45,051 || 1–3 || L1
|- align="center" bgcolor="ffbbbb"
| 5 || April 6 || @ Tigers || 4–8 || Scherzer (1–0) ||Hughes (0–1) ||  || 42,453 || 1–4 || L2
|- align="center" bgcolor="bbffbb"
| 6 || April 7 || @ Tigers || 7–0 || Sabathia (1–1) || Verlander (1–1) || || 39,829 || 2–4 || W1
|- align="center" bgcolor="bbffbb"
| 7 || April 8 || @ Indians || 11–6 || Kuroda (1–1) || Jiménez (0–1) || || 41,567 || 3–4 || W2
|- align="center" bgcolor="bbffbb"
| 8 || April 9 || @ Indians || 14–1 || Pettitte (2–0) || Carrasco (0–1) || || 12,663 || 4–4 || W3
|- align="center" bgcolor="bbbbbb"
| – || April 10 || @ Indians || colspan=7| Postponed (rain). Makeup Date May 13. 
|- align="center" bgcolor="bbbbbb"
| – || April 11 || @ Indians || colspan=7| Postponed (rain). Makeup Date May 13. 
|- align="center" bgcolor="bbffbb"
| 9 || April 12 || Orioles || 5–2 || Sabathia (2–1) || González (1–1) || Rivera (2) || 35,033 || 5–4 || W4
|- align="center" bgcolor="ffbbbb"
| 10 || April 13 || Orioles || 3–5 || Hammel (2–1) || Hughes (0–2) || Johnson (5) || 41,851 || 5–5 || L1
|- align="center" bgcolor="bbffbb"
| 11 || April 14 || Orioles || 3–0 || Kuroda (2–1) ||Chen (0–2) || || 34,154|| 6–5 ||W1
|- align="center" bgcolor="bbffbb"
| 12 || April 16 || Diamondbacks || 4–2 || Nova (1–1) || McCarthy (0–2) || Rivera (3) || 34,107 || 7–5 || W2
|- align="center" bgcolor="bbffbb"
| 13 || April 17 || Diamondbacks || 4–3 || Sabathia (3–1) || Hernandez (0–1)|| Rivera (4) || 34,369 || 8–5 || W3
|- align="center" bgcolor="ffbbbb"
| 14 || April 18 || Diamondbacks || 2–6 (12) || Bell (1–0) || Phelps (0–1) || || 36,033 || 8–6 || L1
|- align="center" bgcolor="bbffbb"
| 15 || April 19 || @ Blue Jays || 9–4 || Pettitte (3–0) || Morrow (0–2) || || 40,028 || 9–6 || W1
|- align="center" bgcolor="bbffbb"
| 16 || April 20 || @ Blue Jays || 5–3 (11)|| Kelley (1–0) || Loup (1–1) || Rivera (5) || 46,095 || 10–6 || W2
|- align="center" bgcolor="ffbbbb"
| 17 || April 21 || @ Blue Jays || 4–8 || Cecil (1–0) || Logan (0–1) || || 45,575 || 10–7 || L1
|- align="center" bgcolor="ffbbbb"
| 18 || April 22 || @ Rays || 1–5 || Moore (4–0) || Sabathia (3–2) || || 15,331 || 10–8 || L2
|- align="center" bgcolor="bbffbb"
| 19 || April 23 || @ Rays || 4–3 || Robertson (1–0) || Price (0–2) || Rivera (6) || 17,644 || 11–8 || W1
|- align="center" bgcolor="ffbbbb"
| 20 || April 24 || @ Rays || 0–3 || Cobb (3–1) || Pettitte (3–1) || Rodney (3) || 19,177 || 11–9 || L1
|- align="center" bgcolor="bbffbb"
| 21 || April 25 || Blue Jays || 5–3 || Kuroda (3–1) || Buehrle (1–1) || Rivera (7) || 31,445 || 12–9 || W1
|- align="center" bgcolor="bbffbb"
| 22 || April 26 || Blue Jays || 6–4 || Phelps (1–1) || Lincoln (0–1) || Rivera (8) || 36,151 || 13–9 || W2
|- align="center" bgcolor="bbffbb"
| 23 || April 27 || Blue Jays || 5–4 || Sabathia (4–2) || Rogers (1–2) || Chamberlain (1) || 40,258 || 14–9 || W3
|- align="center" bgcolor="bbffbb"
| 24 || April 28 || Blue Jays || 3–2 || Logan (1–1) || Dickey (2–4) || Rivera (9) || 36,872 || 15–9 || W4
|- align="center" bgcolor="ffbbbb"
| 25 || April 29 || Astros || 1–9 || Harrell (3–2) || Pettitte (3–2) || || 34,262 || 15–10 || L1
|- align="center" bgcolor="bbffbb"
| 26 || April 30 || Astros || 7–4 || Kuroda (4–1) || Humber (0–6) || Rivera (10) || 34,301 || 16–10 || W1
|-

|- align="center" bgcolor="bbffbb"
| 27 || May 1 || Astros || 5–4 || Logan (2–1) || Clemens (1–1) || Rivera (11) || 34,117 || 17–10 || W2
|- align="center" bgcolor="ffbbbb"
| 28 || May 3 || Athletics || 0–2 || Griffin (3–2) || Sabathia (4–3) || Balfour (4) || 38,090 || 17–11 || L1
|- align="center" bgcolor="bbffbb"
| 29 || May 4 || Athletics || 4–2 || Hughes (1–2) || Colón (3–1) || || 41,349 || 18–11 || W1
|- align="center" bgcolor="ffbbbb"
| 30 || May 5 || Athletics || 4–5 || Doolittle (2–0) || Logan (2–2) || Balfour (5) || 38,134 || 18–12 || L1
|- align="center" bgcolor="ffbbbb"
| 31 || May 7 || @ Rockies || 0–2 || de la Rosa (3–3) || Kuroda (4–2) || Betancourt (9) || 41,595 || 18–13 || L2
|- align="center" bgcolor="bbffbb"
| 32 || May 8 || @ Rockies || 3–2 || Robertson (2–0) || Betancourt (1–1) || Rivera (12) || 40,148 || 19–13 || W1
|- align="center" bgcolor="bbffbb"
| 33 || May 9 || @ Rockies || 3–1 || Warren (1–0) || Francis (1–3) || Rivera (13) || 40,972 || 20–13 || W2
|- align="center" bgcolor="bbffbb"
| 34 || May 10 || @ Royals || 11–6 || Hughes (2–2) || Davis (2–3) || || 24,521 || 21–13 || W3
|- align="center" bgcolor="bbffbb"
| 35 || May 11 || @ Royals || 3–2 || Pettitte (4–2) || Shields (2–3) || Rivera (14) || 30,910 || 22–13 || W4
|- align="center" bgcolor="bbffbb"
| 36 || May 12 || @ Royals || 4–2 || Kuroda (5–2) || Santana (3–2) || Rivera (15) || 29,515 || 23–13 || W5
|- align="center" bgcolor="ffbbbb"                                                                                  
| 37 || May 13 || @ Indians || 0–1 || Masterson (6–2) || Phelps (1–2) || || 23,299 || 23–14 || L1                               
|- align="center" bgcolor="bbffbb"                                                                        
| 38 || May 13 || @ Indians || 7–0 || Nuño (1–0) || Bauer (1–2) || Warren (1) || 23,299 || 24–14 || W1                               
|- align="center" bgcolor="bbffbb"
| 39 || May 14 || Mariners || 4–3 || Kelley (2–0) || Furbush (0–2) || Rivera (16)  || 41,267 || 25–14 || W2
|- align="center" bgcolor="ffbbbb"
| 40 || May 15 || Mariners || 2–12 || Iwakuma (5–1) || Hughes (2–3) || || 34,081 || 25–15 || L1
|- align="center" bgcolor="ffbbbb"
| 41 || May 16 || Mariners || 2–3 || Pérez (1–0) || Pettitte (4–3) || Wilhelmsen (11) || 35,392 || 25–16 || L2
|- align="center" bgcolor="bbffbb"
| 42 || May 17 || Blue Jays || 5–0 || Kuroda (6–2) || Buehrle (1–3) || || 40,008 || 26–16 || W1
|- align="center" bgcolor="bbffbb"
| 43 || May 18 || Blue Jays || 7–2 || Phelps (2–2) || Morrow (1–3) || || 45,577 || 27–16 || W2
|- align="center" bgcolor="bbbbbb"
| – || May 19 || Blue Jays || colspan=7| Postponed (rain).
|- align="center" bgcolor="bbffbb"
| 44 || May 20 || @ Orioles || 6–4 (10) || Robertson (3–0) || Strop (0–2) || Rivera (17) || 24,133 || 28–16 || W3
|- align="center" bgcolor="ffbbbb"
| 45 || May 21 || @ Orioles || 2–3 (10) || Johnson (2–4) || Nuño (1–1) || || 29,040 || 28–17 || L1
|- align="center" bgcolor="ffbbbb"
| 46 || May 22 || @ Orioles || 3–6 || Hammel (6–2) || Kuroda (6–3) || || 26,725 || 28–18 || L2
|- align="center" bgcolor="bbffbb"
| 47 || May 24 || @ Rays || 9–4 || Phelps (3–2) || Hernández (2–5) || || 17,825 || 29–18 || W1
|- align="center" bgcolor="bbffbb"
| 48 || May 25 || @ Rays || 4–3 (11) || Nova (2–1) || Lueke (0–2) || Rivera (18) || 25,874 || 30–18 || W2
|- align="center" bgcolor="ffbbbb"
| 49 || May 26 || @ Rays || 3–8 || Cobb (6–2) || Sabathia (4–4) || || 24,159 || 30–19 || L1
|- align="center" bgcolor="ffbbbb"
| 50 || May 27 || @ Mets || 1–2 || Lyon (2–2) || Robertson (3–1) || Parnell (8) || 32,911 || 30–20 || L2
|- align="center" bgcolor="ffbbbb"
| 51 || May 28 || @ Mets || 1–2 || Rice (3–3) || Rivera (0–1) || || 31,877 || 30–21 || L3
|- align="center" bgcolor="ffbbbb"
| 52 || May 29 || Mets || 4–9 || Hefner (1–5) || Phelps (3–3) || || 43,681 || 30–22 || L4
|- align="center" bgcolor="ffbbbb"
| 53 || May 30 || Mets || 1–3 || Gee (3–6) || Nuño (1–2) || Parnell (9) || 44,207 || 30–23 || L5
|- align="center" bgcolor="bbffbb"
| 54 || May 31 || Red Sox || 4–1 || Sabathia (5–4) || Lester (6–2) || Rivera (19) || 45,141 || 31–23 || W1
|-

|- align="center" bgcolor="ffbbbb"
| 55 || June 1 || Red Sox || 1–11 || Doubront (4–2) || Hughes (2–4) || || 48,784 || 31–24 || L1
|- align="center" bgcolor="ffbbbb"
| 56 || June 2 || Red Sox || 0–3 || Buchholz (8–0) || Kuroda (6–4) || || 43,613 || 31–25 || L2
|- align="center" bgcolor="bbffbb"
| 57 || June 3 || Indians || 7–4 || Kelley (3–0) || Masterson (8–4) || Rivera (20) || 40,007 || 32–25 || W1
|- align="center" bgcolor="bbffbb"
| 58 || June 4 || Indians || 4–3 || Phelps (4–3) || Kazmir (3–3) || Rivera (21) || 36,208 || 33–25 || W2
|- align="center" bgcolor="bbffbb"
| 59 || June 5 || Indians || 6–4 || Sabathia (6–4) || Kluber (3–4) || || 42,477 || 34–25 || W3
|- align="center" bgcolor="bbffbb"
| 60 || June 6 || @ Mariners || 6–1 || Hughes (3–4) || Harang (2–6) || || 18,776 || 35–25 || W4
|- align="center" bgcolor="ffbbbb"
| 61 || June 7 || @ Mariners || 1–4 || Bonderman (1–1) || Kuroda (6–5) || Wilhelmsen (15) || 26,248 || 35–26 || L1
|- align="center" bgcolor="bbffbb"
| 62 || June 8 || @ Mariners || 3–1 || Pettitte (5–3) || Saunders (4–6) || Rivera (22) || 38,252 || 36–26 || W1
|- align="center" bgcolor="bbffbb"
| 63 || June 9 || @ Mariners || 2–1 || Robertson (4–1) || Medina (1–2) || Rivera (23) || 43,389 || 37–26 || W2
|- align="center" bgcolor="ffbbbb"
| 64 || June 11 || @ Athletics || 4–6 || Colón (8–2) || Sabathia (6–5) || Balfour (16) || 27,118 || 37–27 || L1
|- align="center" bgcolor="ffbbbb"
| 64 || June 11 || @ Athletics || 2–5 || Straily (4–2) || Hughes (3–5) || Balfour (17) || 25,176 || 37–28 || L2
|- align="center" bgcolor="ffbbbb"
| 66 || June 13 || @ Athletics || 2–3 (18) || Chavez (1–0) || Claiborne (0–1) || || 27,569 || 37–29 || L3
|- align="center" bgcolor="ffbbbb"
| 67 || June 14 || @ Angels || 2–5 || Wilson (5–5) || Pettitte (5–4) || Frieri (15) || 40,621 || 37–30 || L4
|- align="center" bgcolor="ffbbbb"
| 68 || June 15 || @ Angels || 2–6 || Hanson (4–2) || Phelps (4–4) || || 40,486 || 37–31 || L5
|- align="center" bgcolor="bbffbb"
| 69 || June 16 || @ Angels || 6–5 || Sabathia (7–5) || Weaver (1–3) || Rivera (24) || 41,204 || 38–31 || W1
|- align="center" bgcolor="bbbbbb"
| – || June 18 || Dodgers || colspan=7| Postponed (rain). Makeup Date June 19. 
|- align="center" bgcolor="bbffbb"
| 70 || June 19 || Dodgers || 6–4 || Kuroda (7–5) || Ryu (6–3) || Rivera (25) || 40,604 || 39–31 || W2
|- align="center" bgcolor="ffbbbb"
| 71 || June 19 || Dodgers || 0–6 || Capuano (2–4) || Hughes (3–6) || || 41,320 || 39–32 || L1
|- align="center" bgcolor="ffbbbb"
| 72 || June 20 || Rays || 3–8 || Moore (9–3) || Pettitte (5–5) || || 37,649 || 39–33 || L2
|- align="center" bgcolor="bbffbb"
| 73 || June 21 || Rays || 6–2 || Phelps (5–4) || Hernández (4–8) || || 41,123 || 40–33 || W1
|- align="center" bgcolor="bbffbb"
| 74 || June 22 || Rays || 7–5 || Sabathia (8–5) || Peralta (1–4) || Rivera (26) || 48,013 || 41–33 || W2
|- align="center" bgcolor="ffbbbb"
| 75 || June 23 || Rays || 1–3 || Archer (2–3) || Nova (2–2) || Rodney (15) || 46,054 || 41–34 || L1
|- align="center" bgcolor="bbffbb"
| 76 || June 25 || Rangers  || 4–3 || Rivera (1–1) || Scheppers (5–1) || || 41,674 || 42–34 || W1
|- align="center" bgcolor="ffbbbb"
| 77 || June 26 || Rangers  || 5–8 || Grimm (7–5) || Pettitte (5–6) || Nathan (26) || 38,264 || 42–35 || L1
|- align="center" bgcolor="ffbbbb"
| 78 || June 27 || Rangers || 0–2 || Holland (6–4) || Hughes (3–7) || || 42,138 || 42–36 || L2
|- align="center" bgcolor="ffbbbb"
| 79 || June 28 || @ Orioles || 3–4 || Gausman (1–3) || Sabathia (8–6) || Hunter (2) || 40,041 || 42–37 || L3
|- align="center" bgcolor="ffbbbb"
| 80 || June 29 || @ Orioles || 3–11 || Britton (2–2) || Phelps (5–5) || || 46,607 || 42–38 || L4
|- align="center" bgcolor="ffbbbb"
| 81 || June 30 || @ Orioles || 2–4 || Tillman (10–2) || Kuroda (7–6) || Johnson (28) || 40,878 || 42–39 || L5
|-

|- align="center" bgcolor="bbffbb"
| 82 || July 1 || @ Twins || 10–4 || Chamberlain (1–0) || Burton (1–6) || || 29,619 || 43–39 || W1
|- align="center" bgcolor="bbffbb"
| 83 || July 2 || @ Twins || 7–3 || Hughes (4–7) || Deduno (4–3) || Rivera (27) || 29,029 || 44–39 || W2
|- align="center" bgcolor="bbffbb"
| 84 || July 3 || @ Twins || 3–2 || Sabathia (9–6) || Walters (2–5) || Rivera (28) || 38,457 || 45–39 || W3
|- align="center" bgcolor="bbffbb"
| 85 || July 4 || @ Twins || 9–5 || Phelps (6–5) || Gibson (1–1) || || 38,260 || 46–39 || W4
|- align="center" bgcolor="bbffbb"
| 86 || July 5 || Orioles || 3–2 || Nova (3–2) || Johnson (2–7) || || 43,396 || 47–39 || W5
|- align="center" bgcolor="bbffbb"
| 87 || July 6 || Orioles || 5–4 || Pettitte (6–6) || Tillman (10–3) || Rivera (29) || 42,678 || 48–39 || W6
|- align="center" bgcolor="ffbbbb"
| 88 || July 7 || Orioles || 1–2 || O'Day (5–0) || Rivera (1–2) || Johnson (30) || 40,218 || 48–40 || L1
|- align="center" bgcolor="ffbbbb"
| 89 || July 8 || Royals || 1–5 || Guthrie (8–6) || Hughes (4–8) || Holland (21) || 35,057 || 48–41 || L2
|- align="center" bgcolor="ffbbbb"
| 90 || July 9 || Royals || 1–3 || Shields (4–6) || Sabathia (9–7) || Holland (22) || 35,797 || 48–42 || L3
|- align="center" bgcolor="bbffbb"
| 91 || July 10 || Royals || 8–1 || Nova (4–2) || Davis (4–8) || || 35,781 || 49–42 || W1
|- align="center" bgcolor="bbffbb"
| 92 || July 11 || Royals || 8–4 || Pettitte (7–6) || Santana (5–6) || || 40,381 || 50–42 || W2
|- align="center" bgcolor="bbffbb"
| 93 || July 12 || Twins || 2–0 || Kuroda (8–6) || Pressly (2–2) || Rivera (30) || 40,247 || 51–42 || W3
|- align="center" bgcolor="ffbbbb"
| 94 || July 13 || Twins || 1–4 || Deduno (5–4) || Hughes (4–9) || Perkins (21) || 40,301 || 51–43 || L1
|- align="center" bgcolor="ffbbbb"
| 95 || July 14 || Twins || 4–10 || Gibson (2–2) || Sabathia (9–8) || || 43,131 || 51–44 || L2
|- style="text-align:center;"
|colspan="10" style="background:#bbcaff;"|All-Star Break: AL defeats NL 3–0
|- align="center" bgcolor="ffbbbb"
| 96 || July 19 || @ Red Sox || 2–4 || Doubront (7–3) || Pettitte (7–7) || Uehara (9) || 38,130 || 51–45 || L3
|- align="center" bgcolor="bbffbb"
| 97 || July 20 || @ Red Sox || 5–2 || Kuroda (9–6) || Lackey (7–7) || Rivera (31) || 37,601 || 52–45 || W1
|- align="center" bgcolor="ffbbbb"
| 98 || July 21 || @ Red Sox || 7–8 (11) || Beato (1–0) || Warren (1–1) || || 38,138 || 52–46 || L1
|- align="center" bgcolor="ffbbbb"
| 99 || July 22 || @ Rangers || 0–3 || Darvish (9–4) || Nova (4–3) || Nathan (31) || 42,058 || 52–47 || L2
|- align="center" bgcolor="bbffbb"
| 100 || July 23 || @ Rangers || 5–4 || Chamberlain (2–0) || Nathan (1–1) || Rivera (32) || 42,739 || 53–47 || W1
|- align="center" bgcolor="ffbbbb"
| 101 || July 24 || @ Rangers || 1–3 || Garza (7–1) || Pettitte (7–8) || Nathan (32) || 42,360 || 53–48 || L1
|- align="center" bgcolor="bbffbb"
| 102 || July 25 || @ Rangers || 2–0 || Kuroda (10–6) || Holland (8–6) || Rivera (33) || 35,139 || 54–48 || W1
|- align="center" bgcolor="ffbbbb"
| 103 || July 26 || Rays || 6–10 || Hellickson (10–3) || Sabathia (9–9) || Rodney (25) || 44,486 || 54–49 || L1
|- align="center" bgcolor="ffbbbb"
| 104 || July 27 || Rays || 0–1 || Archer (6–3) || Nova (4–4) || || 43,424 || 54–50 || L2
|- align="center" bgcolor="bbffbb"
| 105 || July 28 || Rays || 6–5 || Rivera (2–2) || McGee (2–3) || || 47,714 || 55–50 || W1
|- align="center" bgcolor="ffbbbb"
| 106 || July 30 || @ Dodgers || 3–2 || Jansen (4–3) || Kelley (3–1) || || 52,447 || 55–51 || L1
|- align="center" bgcolor="bbffbb"
| 107 || July 31 || @ Dodgers || 3–0 || Logan (3–2) || Belisario (4–6) || Rivera (34) || 53,013 || 56–51 || W1
|-

|- align="center" bgcolor="ffbbbb"
| 108 || August 2 || @ Padres || 2–7 || Cashner (8–5) || Sabathia (9–10) || || 44,124 || 56–52 || L1
|- align="center" bgcolor="bbffbb"
| 109 || August 3 || @ Padres || 3–0 || Nova (5–4) || Ross (2–5) || Rivera (35) || 44,184 || 57–52 || W1
|- align="center" bgcolor="ffbbbb"
| 110 || August 4 || @ Padres || 3–6 || Kennedy (4–8) || Hughes (4–10) || Street (21) || 43,504 || 57–53 || L1
|- align="center" bgcolor="ffbbbb"
| 111 || August 5 || @ White Sox || 1–8 || Quintana (6–3) || Pettitte (7–9) || || 27,948 || 57–54 || L2
|- align="center" bgcolor="ffbbbb"
| 112 || August 6 || @ White Sox || 2–3 || Sale (7–11) || Kuroda (10–7) || Reed (27) || 23,826 || 57–55 || L3
|- align="center" bgcolor="ffbbbb"
| 113 || August 7 || @ White Sox || 5–6 (12) || Axelrod (4–8) || Warren (1–2) || || 25,707 || 57–56 || L4
|- align="center" bgcolor="bbffbb"
| 114 || August 9 || Tigers || 4–3 (10) || Kelley (4–1) || Alburquerque (2–3) || || 46,545 || 58–56 || W1
|- align="center" bgcolor="ffbbbb"
| 115 || August 10 || Tigers || 3–9 || Sánchez (10–7) || Hughes (4–11) || || 45,728 || 58–57 || L1
|- align="center" bgcolor="bbffbb"
| 116 || August 11 || Tigers || 5–4  || Rivera (3–2) || Veras (0–5) || || 42,439 || 59–57 || W1
|- align="center" bgcolor="bbffbb"
| 117 || August 12 || Angels || 2–1 || Kuroda (11–7) || Richards (3–5) || Robertson (1) || 37,146 || 60–57 || W2
|- align="center" bgcolor="bbffbb"
| 118 || August 13 || Angels || 14–7 || Sabathia (10–10) || Vargas (6–5) || || 35,013 || 61–57 || W3
|- align="center" bgcolor="bbffbb"
| 119 || August 14 || Angels || 11–3 || Nova (6–4) || Weaver (7–6) || || 38,379 || 62–57 || W4
|- align="center" bgcolor="ffbbbb"
| 120 || August 15 || Angels || 4–8 || Wilson (13–6) || Hughes (4–12) || || 44,682 || 62–58 || L1
|- align="center" bgcolor="bbffbb"
| 121 || August 16 || @ Red Sox || 10–3 || Pettitte (8–9) || Doubront (8–6) || || 38,143 || 63–58 || W1
|- align="center" bgcolor="ffbbbb"
| 122 || August 17 || @ Red Sox || 1–6 || Lackey (8–10) || Kuroda (11–8) || || 37,517 || 63–59 || L1
|- align="center" bgcolor="bbffbb"
| 123 || August 18 || @ Red Sox || 9–6 || Sabathia (11–10) || Dempster (6–9) || Rivera (36) || 37,917 || 64–59 || W1
|- align="center" bgcolor="bbffbb"
| 124 || August 20 || Blue Jays || 8–4 || Nova (7–4) || Wagner (2–4) || || 40,248 || 65–59 || W2
|- align="center" bgcolor="bbffbb"
| 125 || August 20 || Blue Jays || 3–2 || Rivera (4–2) || Oliver (3–4) || || 37,190 || 66–59 || W3
|- align="center" bgcolor="bbffbb"
| 126 || August 21 || Blue Jays || 4–2 || Huff (1–0) || Dickey (9–12) || Rivera (37) || 36,140 || 67–59 || W4
|- align="center" bgcolor="bbffbb"
| 127 || August 22 || Blue Jays || 5–3 || Pettitte (9–9) || Happ (3–3) || Robertson (2) || 40,116 || 68–59 || W5
|- align="center" bgcolor="ffbbbb"
| 128 || August 23 || @ Rays || 2–7 || Archer (7–5) || Kuroda (11–9) || || 24,239 || 68–60 || L1
|- align="center" bgcolor="ffbbbb"
| 129 || August 24 || @ Rays || 2–4 || Price (8–5) || Sabathia (11–11) || Rodney (30)|| 32,862 || 68–61 || L2
|- align="center" bgcolor="bbffbb"
| 130 || August 25 || @ Rays || 3–2 || Logan (4–2) || Wright (2–2) || Rivera (38)|| 34,078 || 69–61 || W1
|- align="center" bgcolor="ffbbbb"
| 131 || August 26 || @ Blue Jays || 2–5 || Dickey (10–12) || Hughes (4–13) || Janssen (24)|| 35,241 || 69–62 || L1
|- align="center" bgcolor="bbffbb"
| 132 || August 27 || @ Blue Jays || 7–1 || Pettitte (10–9) || Happ (3–4) || || 34,047 || 70–62 || W1
|- align="center" bgcolor="ffbbbb"
| 133 || August 28 || @ Blue Jays || 2–7 || Redmond (2–2) || Kuroda (11–10) || || 36,565 || 70–63 || L1
|- align="center" bgcolor="bbffbb"
| 134 || August 30 || Orioles || 8–5 || Sabathia (12–11) || González (8–7) || Rivera (39)|| 45,169 || 71–63 || W1
|- align="center" bgcolor="bbffbb"
| 135 || August 31 || Orioles || 2–0 || Nova (8–4) || Feldman (4–4) || || 42,836 || 72–63 || W2
|-

|- align="center" bgcolor="ffbbbb"
| 136 || September 1 || Orioles || 3–7 || Gausman (2–3) || Kelley (4–2) || || 40,361 || 72–64 || L1
|- align="center" bgcolor="bbffbb"
| 137 || September 2 || White Sox || 9–1 || Huff (2–0) || Quintana (7–5) || || 40,125 || 73–64 || W1
|- align="center" bgcolor="bbffbb"
| 138 || September 3 || White Sox || 6–4 || Logan (5–2) || Jones (4–5) || Rivera (40) || 33,215 || 74–64 || W2
|- align="center" bgcolor="bbffbb"
| 139 || September 4 || White Sox || 6–5 || Sabathia (13–11) || Johnson (0–1) || Rivera (41) || 36,082 || 75–64 || W3
|- align="center" bgcolor="ffbbbb"
| 140 || September 5 || Red Sox || 8–9 || Breslow (5–2) || Chamberlain (2–1) || Uehara (18) || 40,481 || 75–65 || L1
|- align="center" bgcolor="ffbbbb"
| 141 || September 6 || Red Sox || 8–12 || Workman (5–2) || Claiborne (0–2) || || 44,117 || 75–66 || L2
|- align="center" bgcolor="ffbbbb"
| 142 || September 7 || Red Sox || 9–13 || Lackey (9–12) || Huff (2–1) || || 49,046 || 75–67 || L3
|- align="center" bgcolor="bbffbb"
| 143 || September 8 || Red Sox || 4–3 || Rivera (5–2) || Workman (5–3) || || 43,078 || 76–67 || W1
|- align="center" bgcolor="ffbbbb"
| 144 || September 9 || @ Orioles || 2–4 || Tillman (16–5) || Sabathia (13–12) || Johnson (43) || 17,456 || 76–68 || L1
|- align="center" bgcolor="bbffbb"
| 145 || September 10 || @ Orioles || 7–5 || Warren (2–2) || Gausman (2–5) || Rivera (42) || 25,697 || 77–68 || W1
|- align="center" bgcolor="bbffbb"
| 146 || September 11 || @ Orioles || 5–4 || Robertson (5–1) || Hunter (4–4) || Rivera (43) || 20,141 || 78–68 || W2
|- align="center" bgcolor="bbffbb"
| 147 || September 12 || @ Orioles || 6–5 || Rivera (6–2) || Johnson (3–8) || || 24,659 || 79–68 || W3
|- align="center" bgcolor="ffbbbb"
| 148 || September 13 || @ Red Sox || 4–8 || Workman (6–3) || Kuroda (11–11) || || 37,542 || 79–69 || L1
|- align="center" bgcolor="ffbbbb"
| 149 || September 14 || @ Red Sox || 1–5 || Lester (14–8) || Sabathia (13–13) || || 37,510 || 79–70 || L2
|- align="center" bgcolor="ffbbbb"
| 150 || September 15 || @ Red Sox || 2–9 || Buchholz (11–0) || Nova (8–5) || || 37,137 || 79–71 || L3
|- align="center" bgcolor="ffbbbb"
| 151 || September 17 || @ Blue Jays || 0–2 || Dickey (13–12) || Pettitte (10–10) || Janssen (31) || 24,894 || 79–72 || L4
|- align="center" bgcolor="bbffbb"
| 152 || September 18 || @ Blue Jays || 4–3 || Huff (3–1) || Delabar (5–5) || Rivera (44) || 24,247 || 80–72 || W1
|- align="center" bgcolor="ffbbbb"
| 153 || September 19 || @ Blue Jays || 2–6 || Redmond (4–2) || Kuroda (11–12) || Janssen (32) || 32,003 || 80–73 || L1
|- align="center" bgcolor="bbffbb"
| 154 || September 20 || Giants || 5–1 || Sabathia (14–13) || Lincecum (10–14) || || 41,734 || 81–73 || W1
|- align="center" bgcolor="bbffbb"
| 155 || September 21 || Giants || 6–0 || Nova (9–5) || Vogelsong (3–6) || || 42,420 || 82–73 || W2
|- align="center" bgcolor="ffbbbb"
| 156 || September 22 || Giants || 1–2 || Lopez (4–2) || Pettitte (10–11) || Romo (36) || 49,197 || 82–74 || L1
|- align="center" bgcolor="ffbbbb"
| 157 || September 24 || Rays || 0–7 || Moore (16–4) || Kuroda (11–13) || Odorizzi (1) || 43,407 || 82–75 || L2
|- align="center" bgcolor="ffbbbb"
| 158 || September 25 || Rays || 3–8 || Price (9–8) || Hughes (4–14) || || 37,260 || 82–76 || L3
|- align="center" bgcolor="ffbbbb"
| 159 || September 26 || Rays || 0–4 || Cobb (11–3) || Nova (9–6) || || 48,675 || 82–77 || L4
|- align="center" bgcolor="bbffbb"
| 160 || September 27 || @ Astros || 3–2 || Warren (3–2) || Oberholtzer (4–5) || Robertson (3) || 29,486 || 83–77 || W1
|- align="center" bgcolor="bbffbb"
| 161 || September 28 || @ Astros || 2–1 || Pettitte (11–11) || Clemens (4–7) || || 37,199 || 84–77 || W2
|- align="center" bgcolor="bbffbb"
| 162 || September 29 || @ Astros || 5–1 (14) || Daley (1–0) || Harrell (6–17) || || 40,542 || 85–77 || W3
|- align="center" bgcolor="

Detailed records

Farm system

LEAGUE CHAMPIONS: Trenton

References

External links

2013 New York Yankees season Official Site
2013 New York Yankees season at ESPN
2013 New York Yankees season at Baseball Reference

New York Yankees seasons
New York Yankees
New York Yankees
2010s in the Bronx